
Gmina Korczew is a rural gmina (administrative district) in Siedlce County, Masovian Voivodeship, in east-central Poland.

Villages
Gmina Korczew contains the villages and settlements of Bartków, Bużyska, Czaple Górne, Drażniew, Góry, Józefin, Juhana, Knychówek, Korczew, Laskowice, Mogielnica, Mokrany-Gajówka, Nowy Bartków, Ruda, Sarnowiec, Starczewice, Stary Bartków, Szczeglacin, Tokary, Tokary-Gajówka, Zacisze and Zaleś.

Neighbouring gminas
Gmina Korczew is bordered by the gminas of Drohiczyn, Paprotnia, Platerów, Przesmyki and Repki.

References

 Polish official population figures 2006

Korczew
Siedlce County